Zach Reget (born May 7, 1995) is an American professional soccer and futsal player. He was named the Major Arena Soccer League's Rookie of the Year in 2018–19.

Playing career
Zach started his soccer career as a player for Trinity International University team. Then, he went on to play for the St. Louis Ambush where he was awarded the Rookie of the Year. During his season there, he managed to score 22 goals in 24 games as a target forward. Later, Zach signed with Florida Tropics SC and scored a total of 27 goals and made 16 assists of the 2021–22 season.

Zach also played on the United States national futsal team and made an appearance in the CONCACAF Tournament as well as won a silver. He qualified for the 2021 CONCACAF Futsal Championship made an appearance in all the games played. Recently, he was nominated for the 2022 U.S. Futsal Player of the Year and played another season for the Florida Tropics SC in 2022.

References

1995 births
Living people
American soccer players
Futsal forwards
American men's futsal players
Florida Tropics SC players
Major League Soccer players
Soccer players from Wisconsin
Sportspeople from Kenosha, Wisconsin
Missouri Comets players